The 1959–60 Auburn Tigers men's basketball team represented Auburn University in the 1959–60 college basketball season. The team's head coach was Joel Eaves, who was in his eleventh season at Auburn. The team played their home games at Auburn Sports Arena in Auburn, Alabama. They finished the season 19–3, 12–2 in SEC play to win the SEC regular season championship.

References

Auburn Tigers men's basketball seasons
Auburn
Auburn Tigers
Auburn Tigers